Andrei Sergeyevich Potapov (born 26 January 1999) is a Russian football player.

Club career
He made his debut in the Russian Football National League for FC Akron Tolyatti on 22 August 2020 in a game against FC Krasnodar-2.

References

External links
 
 Profile by Russian Football National League
 

1999 births
Sportspeople from Moscow Oblast
People from Ramensky District
Living people
Russian footballers
Association football midfielders
FC Arsenal Tula players
FC Rostov players
FC Saturn Ramenskoye players
FC Akron Tolyatti players
FC Znamya Truda Orekhovo-Zuyevo players
Russian First League players
Russian Second League players